Sidéradougou is a department or commune of Comoé Province in southern Burkina Faso. Its capital is the town of Sidéradougou. According to the 2019 census the department has a total population of 137,675.

Towns and villages
 Sidéradougou	(11,443 inhabitants) (capital)
 Bade	(1,196 inhabitants)
 Banakoro	(1,345 inhabitants)
 Bate	(1,098 inhabitants)
 Banagoubou	(999 inhabitants)
 Boborola	(1,550 inhabitants)
 Bogote	(1,887 inhabitants)
 Bossie	(2,109 inhabitants)
 Dalamba	(480 inhabitants)
 Dandougou	(3,291 inhabitants)
 Dialakoro	(1,078 inhabitants)
 Djanga	(1,290 inhabitants)
 Djassa	(662 inhabitants)
 Degue-Degue	(3,384 inhabitants)
 Deregoue I	(3,699 inhabitants)
 Deregoue II	(4,995 inhabitants)
 Dierisso	(477 inhabitants)
 Doutie	(1,577 inhabitants)
 Faradjan	(2,196 inhabitants)
 Fougangoue	(534 inhabitants)
 Gouandougou	(3,641 inhabitants)
 Gouin-Gouin	(1,460 inhabitants)
 Kadio	(1,494 inhabitants)
 Kassande	(1,307 inhabitants)
 Kapongouan	(1,927 inhabitants)
 Kogoue	(1,206 inhabitants)
 Kotou	(587 inhabitants)
 Konkan	(223 inhabitants)
 Kokanko	(1,658 inhabitants)
 Kouere	(3,195 inhabitants)
 Kouendi	(2,407 inhabitants)
 Kotougouni	(621 inhabitants)
 Noumousso	(776 inhabitants)
 Pima	(831 inhabitants)
 Sampobien	(1,727 inhabitants)
 Tanga	(447 inhabitants)
 Tiefindougou	(874 inhabitants)
 Tomodjan	(1,324 inhabitants)
 Yade	(1,516 inhabitants)
 Zangazoli	(3,699 inhabitants)

References

Departments of Burkina Faso
Comoé Province